The 1980 Basildon District Council election took place on 1 May 1980 to elect members of Basildon District Council in Essex, England. This was on the same day as other local elections. One third of the council was up for election; the seats of the candidates who finished third in each ward in the all-out election of 1979. The council remained under no overall control.

Overall results

|-
| colspan=2 style="text-align: right; margin-right: 1em" | Total
| style="text-align: right;" | 14
| colspan=5 |
| style="text-align: right;" | 42,094
| style="text-align: right;" |

Ward results

Billericay East

Billericay West

Burstead

Fryerns Central

Fryerns East

Laindon

Langdon Hills

Lee Chapel North

Nethermayne

Pitsea East

Pitsea West

Vange

Wickford North

Wickford South

References

1980
1980 English local elections
1980s in Essex